Ebertidia is a genus of moths of the family Noctuidae.

Species
Ebertidia hadenoides Boursin, 1967
Ebertidia mamestrina (Butler, 1889)

References
Natural History Museum Lepidoptera genus database

Hadeninae